Skeheenarinky is a townland in south-west County Tipperary, Ireland. It is a dispersed settlement with a focal point at Skeheenarinky Cross
where a school is located.

Location
Situated between the foothills of the Galtee Mountains and the low-lying farmland at the north end of Ballyporeen civil parish.
It lies on a stretch of the former main Cork-Dublin road that was superseded by the M8 Motorway in 2008. This road is now designated as the R639 regional road. 
Mitchelstown and Cahir are approximately 10 km and 20 km respectively.

History
The Mitchelstown Caves are situated approximately 3 km. from Skeheenarinky Cross and were discovered in 1833 by a labourer quarrying on a small farm. Today the caves are a popular tourist attraction.

Skeheenarinky was once the location of an extravagant mansion called Galtee Castle, the original structure built for the 2nd Earl of Kingston dated from the late 18th Century, it was later remodelled and expanded but was completely demolished c.1941.

Former Taoiseach, Garret FitzGerald and British model/singer Samantha Fox can trace ancestry to the area.

Amenities

Skeheenarinky National School was built in 1858 and celebrated its 150th anniversary in November 2008, a book chronicling its history was produced to mark the occasion. The building itself is notable for its cut limestone construction. Nearby Galty Cottage (c.1858) was built as a home for the teacher. It is known as 'Morrisseys' in recognition of a Mrs. Morrissey who taught at the school and lived there for fifty years.  The school's primary catchment area comprises the Coolagaranroe electoral division, this recorded a population of 565 at the 2016 national census.

Skeheenarinky GAA is the local Gaelic Athletic Association club.

Further reading

Hard Days and Happy Days - A History of Skeheenarinky National School, by Ed O'Riordan and Karol DeFalco, published by the National School Parents' Council, 2008.

References

External links
 Community Website

Townlands of County Tipperary